Katherine Sebov was the defending champion, but chose not to participate.

Indy de Vroome won the title, defeating Robin Anderson in the final, 3–6, 6–4, 7–5.

Seeds

Draw

Finals

Top half

Bottom half

References

Main Draw

Challenger Banque Nationale de Saguenay - Singles
Challenger de Saguenay